Qeshlaq Aghdash may refer to:
Qeshlaq Aghdash-e Bahram
Qeshlaq Aghdash-e Beyglar
Qeshlaq Aghdash-e Hasan Hazi Owghli
Qeshlaq Aghdash-e Mahmud
Qeshlaq Aghdash-e Nasir